Hristo Arangelov (born 25 February 1978) is a Bulgarian former footballer, and assistant manager of Septemvri Sofia.

He spent his playing career at Pirin Blagoevgrad, Minyor Pernik, Marek Dupnitsa, Dunav Ruse, Hebar Pazardzhik, Spartak Varna and Balkan Botevgrad.

Managing career

Septemvri Sofia
In 2013 Arangelov joined DIT Sofia as a youth coach and in 2015 he became assistant manager in Septemvri Sofia since Dit Academy merged with the club.

He also served as a caretaker manager from the beginning of 2016 until the summer, since Nikolay Mitov joined Pirin Razlog. Mitov returned as manager of the team for 2016-17 season, but in March 2017 joined Levski Sofia and Arangelov stepped up on the managing position once again.

On 8 June 2017 Dimitar Vasev was announced as the new manager of Septemvri Sofia with Arangelov as a first assistant again.

References

1978 births
Living people
Bulgarian footballers
OFC Pirin Blagoevgrad players
PFC Minyor Pernik players
PFC Marek Dupnitsa players
FC Dunav Ruse players
PFC Spartak Varna players
First Professional Football League (Bulgaria) players
Association football defenders